The Windsor Gotfredsons were a minor league professional ice hockey team and one of the four founding members of the International Hockey League in 1945. The team was based in Windsor, Ontario and played at the Windsor Arena. After one season, they became known as the Windsor Staffords, and two years later became Windsor Ryan Cretes. The team played five seasons total, folding in 1950.

Season-by-season results

See also
List of ice hockey teams in Ontario
Wilfred "Boomer" Harding, first Black player in the International Hockey League, with the Windsor Staffords in 1946

Defunct ice hockey teams in Canada
Ice hockey teams in Ontario
International Hockey League (1945–2001) teams
Sport in Windsor, Ontario
Ice hockey clubs established in 1945
Ice hockey clubs disestablished in 1950